Olaf Skavlan (25 January 1838 – 30 May 1891) was a Norwegian literary historian and playwright.

Personal life
He was born as Ole Skavlan in Stranda as a son of vicar and politician Aage Schavland (1806–1876) and his wife Gerhardine Pauline Bergh (1817–1884). He was a brother of Sigvald Skavlan, Einar Skavlan, Sr., Aage Skavlan and Harald Skavlan.

In August 1879 in Stavanger he married Dagmar Kielland (1855–1931). Through this marriage he was a son-in-law of Jens Zetlitz Kielland, a brother-in-law of Ludvig Daae, Elling Holst, Kitty Lange Kielland, Alexander Kielland, Jacob Kielland and Tycho Kielland. He was the father of Einar Skavlan, father-in-law of Arnstein Arneberg and grandfather of Merete Skavlan.

Career
He debuted as a fiction writer as a student. In 1871 he took the doctorate on the thesis Holberg som Komedieforfatter, about Ludvig Holberg as a comedy writer. In the periodical Nyt norsk Tidsskrift he published a study of Henrik Wergeland's work Skabelsen, Mennesket og Messias. This contributed to an understanding of Wergeland as a liberal political figure, not following the politically conservative tradition that branded Wergelenad as an apolitical wordsmith. Skavlan was appointed as a professor at the Royal Frederick University in 1877. He also co-founded and edited the satirical magazine Vikingen, and published the periodical Nyt tidsskrift, between 1882 and 1887 and together with Ernst Sars. In 1884 he was a co-founder of the Norwegian Association for Women's Rights, and he was a member of its first board of directors.

Skavlan died in May 1891 in Kristiania.

References

1838 births
1891 deaths
Norwegian literary historians
Academic staff of the University of Oslo
Norwegian magazine editors
Norwegian biographers
Male biographers
People from Møre og Romsdal
People from Stranda
19th-century journalists
Male journalists
19th-century Norwegian dramatists and playwrights
Norwegian male dramatists and playwrights
19th-century Norwegian male writers
Norwegian Association for Women's Rights people